P. M. Narasimhan is a politician from Tamil Nadu, India. He was elected from the Tiruttani constituency to the Fifteenth Tamil Nadu Legislative Assembly as a member of the All India Anna Dravida Munnetra Kazhagam political party in the 2016 Tamil Nadu legislative assembly elections.

Elections contested

References 

All India Anna Dravida Munnetra Kazhagam politicians
Year of birth missing (living people)
Living people
Tamil Nadu MLAs 2016–2021
Tamil Nadu MLAs 2001–2006
Tamil Nadu MLAs 1980–1984
Tamil Nadu MLAs 1985–1989